Midual is a French high-end motorcycle manufacturer. Founded in 1997 by brothers Olivier and François Midy, the company is headquartered in Angers, France. A first prototype, the Midual 900, was presented in 1999 at the Paris Motor Show, but sufficient funding could not be found and the project was abandoned.

In August 2014 the brand announced a new model at the Pebble Beach Concours d'Elegance, the Midual Type 1. The announced price is £140,000 (€155,000), making it one of the most expensive motorcycles in the world. The Type 1 is produced in a limited series.

References

External links
 Midual official web site

Motorcycle manufacturers of France
French brands
Economy of Maine-et-Loire